Tom Pedigo (March 4, 1940 – January 25, 2000) was an American set decorator. He was nominated for an Academy Award in the category Best Art Direction for the film Terms of Endearment. He was also nominated for two Emmy Awards, winning one for OUTSTANDING INDIVIDUAL ACHIEVEMENT IN ART DIRECTION FOR A SERIES - 1993 for the TV series Homefront.

Selected filmography
 Terms of Endearment (1983)

References

External links

1940 births
2000 deaths
Emmy Award winners
American set decorators
People from Los Angeles